Sunrise Mountain may refer to:
 Sunrise Mountain (Nevada), a peak on the east side of the Las Vegas Valley
 Sunrise Mountain, part of the Kittatinny Mountain ridge in New Jersey
 Sunrise Mountain, part of the Killington Ski Resort in Vermont